The results of the First Periodical Review of the Boundary Commission for Scotland became effective for the 1955 general election of the House of Commons of the Parliament of the United Kingdom (Westminster). The review defined 32 burgh constituencies (BCs) and 39 county constituencies (CCs), with each electing one Member of Parliament (MP) by the first past the post system of election. Therefore, Scotland had 71 parliamentary seats.

Each constituency was entirely within a county or a grouping of two or three counties, or was if the cities of Aberdeen, Dundee, Edinburgh and Glasgow are regarded as belonging, respectively to the county of Aberdeen, the county of Angus, the county of Midlothian and the county of Lanark.

There were changes to the boundaries of nine Scottish constituencies for the 1964 general election but, throughout the 1955 to 1974 period, there was no change to county groupings, to the total numbers of constituencies and MPs, or to constituency names.

The results of the Second Periodical Review and a subsequent interim review were implemented for the February 1974 general election.

Notes and references 

 1955
1955 in British politics
1955 establishments in Scotland
1974 disestablishments in Scotland
Constituencies of the Parliament of the United Kingdom established in 1955
Constituencies of the Parliament of the United Kingdom disestablished in 1974
1974 in British politics